Euryglottis johannes is a moth of the  family Sphingidae. It is known from Venezuela.

References

Euryglottis
Moths described in 1998